Igualada is a railway station on the Llobregat–Anoia Line serving the city of the same name, in Catalonia, Spain. It is located adjacent to the bus station, in the southeastern part of town. The railway station is the northern terminus of the Igualada line branch and is served by commuter rail lines R6 and R60.

Although the current station opened in 1978, a narrow gauge railway line from Martorell, predecessor of the current line, had already been serving the city since 1893. In 2015, it was announced that the current at-grade station is to be put underground together with a  line portion, removing the only level crossing in town.

History
Originally, it was envisaged that Igualada would be part of the Madrid to Barcelona railway through central Catalonia. This plan, however, was dropped in favour of Manresa, located further north. On , the railway eventually arrived in Igualada in the form of a narrow gauge line from Martorell, built and operated by Ferrocarril Central Catalán ("Catalan Central Railway"), which would later become the current Llobregat–Anoia Line. The original terminus station was located at-grade in the northwestern part of the city. The recovered land allowed for the extension of the Passeig Mossèn Jacint Verdaguer boulevard.

Notes

References

External links
 
 Information and photos of the station at trenscat.cat 

Stations on the Llobregat–Anoia Line
Railway stations in Spain opened in 1978
Igualada
Transport in Anoia